HMAS Attack (P 90) was the lead ship of the s used by the Royal Australian Navy (RAN). Launched in April 1967 and commissioned in November that year, the ship was largely commercial  in design and was used to protect fisheries in Australia's northern waters, and to support the survey ship . The vessel remained in RAN service until 1985 when it was transferred to the Indonesian Navy and renamed Sikuda.

Design and construction

The Attack class was ordered in 1964 to operate in Australian waters as patrol boats based on lessons learned through using the s on patrols of Borneo during the Indonesia-Malaysia Confrontation, and to replace a variety of old patrol, search-and-rescue, and general-purpose craft. Initially, nine were ordered for the RAN, with another five for Papua New Guinea's Australian-run coastal security force, although another six ships were later ordered to bring the class to twenty vessels.

The ship's company consisted of three officers and sixteen sailors. Its main armament was a bow-mounted Bofors 40 mm gun, supplemented by two .50-calibre M2 Browning machine guns and various small arms. The ships were designed with as many commercial components as possible: the Attacks were to operate in remote regions of Australia and New Guinea, and a town's hardware store would be more accessible than home base in a mechanical emergency.

Attack was built by Evans Deakin and Company at Brisbane, Queensland, launched on 8 April 1967 and commissioned on 17 November 1967. Although it was the lead ship of the class, Attack was the second ship commissioned into the RAN, four days behind .

Operational history
Following its commission, Attack served in the RAN for 17 years, during which time it was employed mainly in the waters to Australia's north, protecting fisheries. Attack paid off on 21 February 1985. She was transferred to the Indonesian Navy on 24 May 1985 and renamed Sikuda.

Citations

References

Attack-class patrol boats
1967 ships